The 2021–22 season was Livingston's fourth consecutive season in the Scottish Premiership, the top flight of Scottish football. Livingston also competed in the Scottish Cup and the League Cup.

Season Summary
The 2021–22 season was Livingston first full season under the management of David Martindale. Marvin Bartley who had been named club captain and head coach of the Livi reserve team the previous season was promoted to the position of assistant manager in May 2021.

Results & fixtures

Pre-season

Scottish Premiership

Scottish League Cup

Group stage

Knockout round

Scottish Cup

Squad statistics

Appearances
As of 15 May 2022

|-
|colspan="17"|Players who left the club during the season
|-

|-
|}

Team statistics

League table

League Cup table

Transfers

Players in

Players out

Loans in

Loans out

See also
 List of Livingston F.C. seasons

References

Livingston F.C. seasons
Livingston